Garnet Pavatea (also known as Flower Girl) (1915–1981) was a Hopi-Tewa potter.

Early life and education 
She was born in Hano, near First Mesa, Arizona to a Tewa mother and Hopi father. Her father, Duwakaku (c. 1865–1956), was a silversmith.

Career 
She began making pottery in the 1940s. She worked with red clay, as well as black and red slip. Her bowls often had triangular indentations around the rims.

She often demonstrated her creative process for visitors at the Museum of Northern Arizona. Her work is held at several museums worldwide, including the National Museum of the American Indian, the University of Michigan Museum of Art, the C.N. Gorman Museum, and the Museum of the Red River.

Personal life 
She was married to Womak Pavatea, and had a daughter, Wilma Rose Pavatea, who also created pottery.

References 

Hopi-Tewa people
20th-century Native American women
20th-century Native Americans
Native American potters
American women ceramists
Artists from Arizona
People from Navajo County, Arizona
20th-century American women artists
20th-century American ceramists
1915 births
1981 deaths
Native American people from Arizona